In mathematics, a Hurwitz matrix, or Routh–Hurwitz matrix, in engineering stability matrix, is a structured real square matrix constructed with coefficients of a real polynomial.

Hurwitz matrix and the Hurwitz stability criterion
Namely, given a real polynomial

the  square matrix

is called Hurwitz matrix corresponding to the polynomial .
(that is, all its roots have strictly negative real part) if and only if all the leading principal minors of the matrix  are positive:

and so on. The minors  are called the Hurwitz determinants. Similarly, if  then the polynomial is stable if and only if the principal minors have alternating signs starting with a negative one.

Hurwitz stable matrices
In engineering and stability theory, a square matrix  is called a stable matrix (or sometimes a Hurwitz matrix) if every eigenvalue of  has strictly negative real part, that is,

for each eigenvalue .  is also called a stability matrix, because then the differential equation

is asymptotically stable, that is,  as 

If  is a (matrix-valued) transfer function, then  is called Hurwitz if the poles of all elements of  have negative real part. Note that it is not necessary that  for a specific argument  be a Hurwitz matrix — it need not even be square. The connection is that if  is a Hurwitz matrix, then the dynamical system
 	
 	
has a Hurwitz transfer function.

Any hyperbolic fixed point (or equilibrium point) of a continuous dynamical system is locally asymptotically stable if and only if the Jacobian of the dynamical system is Hurwitz stable at the fixed point.

The Hurwitz stability matrix is a crucial part of control theory. A system is stable if its control matrix is a Hurwitz matrix. The negative real components of the eigenvalues of the matrix represent negative feedback. Similarly, a system is inherently unstable if any of the eigenvalues have positive real components, representing positive feedback.

See also
 Liénard–Chipart criterion
 M-matrix
 P-matrix
 Perron–Frobenius theorem
 Z-matrix

References

External links

Matrices
Differential equations